Haider Akbar Khan Rono (born 31 August 1942) is a Bangladeshi public leader, theorist and writer. He is a member of the Politburo of the Communist Party of Bangladesh. He has published 13 books. He has received the Bangla Academy Literary Award (2021).

Early life 
Rono was born on 31 August 1942 in Calcutta, Bengal Presidency, British India (now Kolkata, India) to engineer Hatem Ali Khan. His grandfather, Syed Nausher Ali, was an Indian politician and his younger brother, Haider Anwar Khan Juno, was a leftist politician and freedom fighter.

Education 
Rono passed the Secondary School Certificate (SSC) from St Gregory's High School in 1958 and was added to the 12th position of the merit list of the East Pakistan (now Bangladesh). Before, he studied at Jessore Zilla School and Rajshahi Collegiate School. In 1960, he passed the Indian School Certificate (ISC) from Notre Dame College, Dhaka. In 1960, he was admitted in the Department of Physics at the University of Dhaka. But couldn't finish the course for imprisonment and other causes. Later, when he was in prison, he completed a bachelor's degree in law.

Career 
In 2006, Rono was awarded the Prothom Alo Best Book of the Year 1411.

Rono is a member of the Politburo of Workers' Party of Bangladesh in 2008. He has spoken against International Monetary Fund and the World Bank.

In 2012, Rono was a Presidium member of Communist Party of Bangladesh.

In January 2022, Rono was awarded the Bangla Academy Literary Award.

References 

Living people
1942 births
People from Kolkata
Communist Party of Bangladesh politicians
Bangladeshi communists
Recipients of Bangla Academy Award